Pamela Palmater (born 1970) is a Mi'kmaq lawyer, professor, activist and politician from New Brunswick, Canada.  A frequent media political commentator, she appears for Aboriginal Peoples Television Network's InFocus, CTV, and CBC. She is an associate professor and the academic director of the Centre for Indigenous Governance at Toronto Metropolitan University.

Early life
Palmater's family is from Eel River, New Brunswick. Pamela's parents decided to move the family to St. Mary's area in Frederiction in hopes of giving a better life for their children.

Education 
She graduated with a Bachelor of Arts from Saint Thomas University in 1994 with a double major in Native Studies and History. She then graduated from the University of New Brunswick in 1997 with a Bachelor of Laws. In 1999, she graduated from Dalhousie University with a Master in Laws in Aboriginal Law. In 2009, Palmater obtained a Doctorate in Aboriginal Law from Dalhousie University Law School with her thesis entitled, "Beyond Blood: Rethinking Aboriginal Identity and Belonging".

Career
Palmater is active in the Assembly of First Nations and is head of the Centre for Indigenous Governance at Toronto Metropolitan University, where she is a professor in the Department of Politics and Public Administration. She worked for the federal government for over ten years, and was a director at Indian and Northern Affairs managing portfolios responsible for First Nations treaties, land claims and self-government.

In 2012, Palmater was the runner up in the  Assembly of First Nations leadership elections for national chief. Her social advocacy highlighting Indigenous issues and missing and murdered Indigenous women bestowed many awards throughout her career.

In 2021, Palmater began contributing to the online news website The Breach.

Awards
2012 YWCA Toronto Woman of Distinction Award in Social Justice.

2012 Women's Courage Award in Social Justice.

2012 Bertha Wilson Honour Society (Inaugural Inductee).

2013 Top 25 Most Influential Lawyer: Top 5 in Human Rights.

2014 Canada's Top Visionary Women Leaders: Top 23.

2014 Building a Better World Designation: Nation-Builder.

2015 UNB Alumni Award of Distinction.

2016 Ryerson's Aboriginal Role Model.

2016 21 Inspirational First Nation, Mets, Inuit Women Leaders.

2016 J.S. Woodsworth Woman of Excellence Award in Human Rights and Equality.

2016 Margaret Mead Award in Social Justice.

2017 Doctor of Laws honoris causa.

2017 Award for Excellence in Human Rights.

Publications

Indigenous nationhood: empowering grassroots citizens (Fernwood, 2015)

Stretched Beyond Human Limits: Death by Poverty in First Nations (for publication in 2012).

Beyond Blood: Rethinking Indigenous Identity and Belonging. (Saskatoon: Purich Publishing, 2011)

Our Children, Our Future, Our Vision: First Nation Jurisdiction over First Nation Education for the Chiefs of Ontario

In My Brother's Footsteps: Is R. v. Powley the Path to Recognized Aboriginal Identity for Non-Status Indians? in J. Magnet, D. Dorey, eds., Aboriginal Rights Litigation (Markham: LexisNexis, 2003) 149.
Stretched Beyond Human Limits: Death by Poverty in First Nations (2012) 65/66 Canadian Review of Social Policy.

References

External links
 Personal web site
 Lecture on the future Indian policy of Canada, 2012
part 1
part 2
part 3
part 4

1970 births
Canadian women lawyers
First Nations lawyers
Living people
Mi'kmaq people
Lawyers in New Brunswick
First Nations women writers
Canadian legal writers
21st-century First Nations writers
21st-century Canadian women writers
21st-century Canadian non-fiction writers
Canadian women non-fiction writers
Canadian indigenous women academics
First Nations academics
Indigenous studies in Canada